The Albert B. Alkek Library is the main central library of Texas State University. The Wittliff collections of Southwestern Writers and Southwestern & Mexican Photography is located on the seventh floor of the Alkek Library

The university's library was named, in 1991, for an alumnus who became an oilman, rancher, and philanthropist, Albert B. Alkek. The Albert B. Alkek Library serves as the main, central academic library supporting the Texas State University (then called Southwest Texas State University) community. As a storehouse for United States and Texas government documents, the library receives a large number of government publications from the state and 60% of all federal publications. The mission of the library, as stated by University Officials, "is to advance the teaching and research mission of the University and support students, faculty, staff and the greater community by providing patron‐centered services, comprehensive and diverse collections, individual and collaborative learning environments, innovative technologies, and opportunities to learn, create and discover."

Among the Library's seven floors, students encounter over 1.5 million printed texts, over 2 million microfilm & audio-visual materials, 546,700 electronic books, 471 databases, 110,800+ electronic journals, University Archives, and curriculum materials approved by the Texas Education Agency for primary and secondary schools. In addition to the vast amount of resources, the Library encompasses niche collections which are rare to the University. These holdings include The Wittliff Collections housed on the Library's seventh floor, the King of the Hill archives, major work of significant writers such as Cormac McCarthy, Sandra Cisneros and Sam Shepard, and the Lonesome Dove collection.

Accessing the Library

The library's online catalog allows anyone to locate books, DVDs, journal holdings or other material. Library materials are in many cases accessible to the general public. Many Texas residents (not just Texas State students, faculty, and staff) are able to check out materials through the TexShare program. Access to e-books or databases is limited to current Texas State students, staff and faculty. Instructional technologies are located on the 1st floor and assist faculty and students with multimedia production, classroom support, Internet deployment, and web design.

References

External links
Alkek Library

Buildings and structures in San Marcos, Texas
Texas State University
Libraries in Hays County, Texas